Players and pairs who neither have high enough rankings nor receive wild cards may participate in a qualifying tournament held one week before the annual Wimbledon Tennis Championships.

Seeds

  Līga Dekmeijere /  Darija Jurak (first round)
  Shuko Aoyama /  Rika Fujiwara (qualified)
  Eva Birnerová /  Petra Cetkovská (first round)
  Lindsay Lee-Waters /  Megan Moulton-Levy (qualified)
  Marina Erakovic /  Tamarine Tanasugarn (qualifying competition, lucky losers)
  Noppawan Lertcheewakarn /  Jessica Moore (qualifying competition, lucky losers)
  Nina Bratchikova /  Valeria Savinykh (qualifying competition)
  Elena Bogdan /  Lesia Tsurenko (first round)

Qualifiers

  Vesna Dolonc /  Katalin Marosi
  Shuko Aoyama /  Rika Fujiwara
  Urszula Radwańska /  Arina Rodionova
  Lindsay Lee-Waters /  Megan Moulton-Levy

Lucky losers

  Marina Erakovic /  Tamarine Tanasugarn
  Noppawan Lertcheewakarn /  Jessica Moore
  Sophie Lefèvre /  Evgeniya Rodina

Qualifying draw

First qualifier

Second qualifier

Third qualifier

Fourth qualifier

External links

2011 Wimbledon Championships – Women's draws and results at the International Tennis Federation

Women's Doubles Qualifying
Wimbledon Championship by year – Women's doubles qualifying
Wimbledon Championships